The Gunfighter is a 1923 American silent Western film directed by Lynn Reynolds and starring William Farnum, Doris May and Lee Shumway. Two mountain-dwelling families are engaged in a bitter feud.

Cast
 William Farnum as Billy Buell 
 Doris May as Nellie Camp 
 Lee Shumway as Joe Benchley 
 J. Morris Foster as Lew Camp 
 Virginia True Boardman as Marjorie Camp 
 Irene Hunt as Alice Benchley 
 Arthur Morrison as Jacob Benchley 
 Cecil Van Auker as William Camp 
 Jerry Campbell as Henry Benchley

References

External links
 
 

1923 films
1923 Western (genre) films
Films directed by Lynn Reynolds
Fox Film films
American black-and-white films
Silent American Western (genre) films
1920s English-language films
1920s American films